The men's field hockey tournament at the 2009 Australian Youth Olympic Festival (AYOF) was the second edition of the men's field hockey competition at the AYOF.

Australia won the tournament for the second time, defeating India 2–1 in golden goal extra time.

Competition format
The tournament featured the national under–21 teams of Great Britain, India, Malaysia, and the hosts, Australia, competing in a round-robin format, with each team playing each other once. Three points were awarded for a win, one for a draw, and none for a loss.

At the conclusion of the pool stage, the top two teams contested the final, while the bottom two teams played off for third place.

Teams
The following four teams competed for the title:

Officials
The following umpires were appointed by the International Hockey Federation to officiate the tournament:

 Suketu Khabaria (SGP)
 Azmi Safar (MAS)
 Gurinder Singh Sangha (IND)
 Dane Stevenson (AUS)
 Paul Walker (GBR)

Results

Preliminary round

Pool

Fixtures

Classification round

Third and fourth place

Final

Statistics

Final standings

Goalscorers

References

External links
Hockey Australia

Field hockey at the Australian Youth Olympic Festival